Lord of the Rings Adventure Game is a role-playing game based on the writings of J. R. R. Tolkien (specifically The Lord of the Rings and The Hobbit) under license from Tolkien Enterprises. Iron Crown Enterprises (I.C.E.) published the game until they lost the license on 22 September 1999.

Setting
The setting for LOR is an expanded version of J. R. R. Tolkien's Middle-earth. Published campaign sourcebooks are set just before the year 3018 of the Third Age, i.e. just before the War of the Ring. The Player Characters are able to interact with the main characters of The Lord of the Rings, but do not take direct roles in the outcome of those events.

System
Originally published by Iron Crown Enterprises (I.C.E.) in 1991-1993, LOR was a simple, "level-less" roleplaying system designed to help introduce new players (and game masters) to roleplaying in the world of J. R. R. Tolkien's The Hobbit and The Lord of the Rings. It uses only two 6-sided dice to resolve skill checks and combat. It was an expansion of the even simpler rules used by ICE for its Middle-earth Quest books. It was intended as a stepping stone to I.C.E.’s more complex Middle-earth Role Playing (MERP) system and game modules.

Players can create characters from the races of Men, Elves, Dwarves, Hobbits and Half-elves.

Characters possess Attributes and Skills rated between -5 and +5. Skills can be modified to a rating above or below these limits (i.e. under -5 or over +5). An attack roll consists of a roll of 2D6, to which the attacker's skill rating and appropriate weapon rating are added and the defender's defense and armor rating are subtracted. The result is looked up on a table to determine success or failure, and if it is a success how much damage is done.

Spell casters can only learn a very limited number of spells. Some feel this is more in tune with the flavor of Tolkien's writings than other systems.

History
The system’s first entry was a boxed set (ICE #LR0) containing the scenario "Dawn Comes Early" which also included guidelines, maps, character bios, and cardboard characters with stands. The next was the scenario book "Darker Than the Darkness" (ICE #LR1) and then the scenario book "Over the Misty Mountains Cold" (ICE #LR2). Two more scenario books in the series were planned but never published.

Two subsequent Middle-earth based role-playing games, The Lord of the Rings Roleplaying Game (2002) and The One Ring Roleplaying Game (2011), were published respectively by Decipher Inc. and Cubicle 7. Except for the original source material, the Decipher and Cubicle 7 games share no link to ICE's Lord of the Rings Adventure Game and use entirely different rules systems.

References

Role-playing games based on Middle-earth
Fantasy role-playing games
Iron Crown Enterprises games
Role-playing games introduced in 1991